Maureen Orth is an American journalist, author, and a Special Correspondent for Vanity Fair magazine. She is the founder of Marina Orth Foundation, which has established a model education program in Colombia emphasizing technology, English, and leadership  She is the widow of TV journalist Tim Russert.

Orth’s research was the basis of multi-episode documentaries and television films about Woody Allen, Michael Jackson and Andrew Cunanan.

Early life and education
Maureen Orth grew up in the Bay Area of California, the daughter of Helen (Pierotti) Orth and Karl Orth. She has two siblings, Christina Orth and the late Dan Orth.

Orth attended Alameda High School. She studied at the University of California, Berkeley, where she graduated in 1964 with a degree in political science. At Berkeley, Orth was a member of the Kappa Kappa Gamma sorority.

Following her graduation from college, she served in the Peace Corps in Medellín, Colombia, from 1964 to 1966. Orth later earned a master's degree in Journalism and Documentary Film from UCLA in 1969.

Career 
Before launching her career in journalism, Orth worked in Washington, DC and helped organize the hearings for the House Select Subcommittee Environmental Education Act in conjunction with the first Earth Day.

Orth began her journalism career in San Francisco in 1970 chronicling issues of the counter culture for the San Francisco Examiner. She was mentored by author Alex Haley. In 1971, she became the West Coast correspondent of The Village Voice and also freelanced for the Los Angeles Times and Rolling Stone.

In 1972, Orth joined TVTV, a pioneering video group that had obtained a PBS grant to cover both the Republican and Democratic Conventions in Miami, Florida. The resulting films used the first ever footage shot on the convention floor using ½ inch Sony portapack videotape.

Orth moved to New York in 1973. She wrote the Ms. Magazine cover story titled “Suffer the Little Children…The American Child-Care Disgrace.”

Newsweek 
Orth was hired as one of the first female writers for Newsweek, covering music, books and movies. She was a plaintiff in a successful 1970 lawsuit claiming that the newsroom discriminated against women. At Newsweek, Orth wrote eight cover stories in five years on subjects including Bob Dylan, Bruce Springsteen, Stevie Wonder, and The Godfather Part II film. She was the only journalist to report from the notoriously chaotic set of Apocalypse Now in the Philippines.

In 1975, Orth took a brief leave of absence from Newsweek to be the assistant to director Lina Wertmuller, in Italy, during the filming of Seven Beauties. This film was nominated for an Academy Award for Best Foreign Film. She later wrote about the experience in an article for the magazine.

When news broke in August 1977 that Elvis Presley had died, Orth requested to be sent to Memphis, Tennessee to cover the story. She wrote the first news piece to suggest that Presley's official cause of death might not have been a heart attack. She was a contestant on The Gong Show and wrote about it for the magazine.

Freelance work 
Between 1978 and 1980 Orth was a senior editor at New York, and New West Magazines. In 1981-1982 she was the principal correspondent of Newsweek Woman on Lifetime Television. From 1983 to 1984 she was a network correspondent for NBC News. Orth was a contributing editor at Vogue from 1984 to 1989, and a columnist for New York Woman from 1986 to 1990. She has also freelanced for the New York Times, Washington Post and the Wall Street Journal.

Vanity Fair 
Orth has written for Vanity Fair since 1988 and has been a Special Correspondent for that magazine since 1993. Among the heads of state she has interviewed are Russian President Vladimir Putin, German Chancellor Angela Merkel, British Prime Minister Margaret Thatcher, Argentinian President Carlos Menem, and Irish President Mary Robinson. Orth secured the first interview with Thatcher just months after leaving office.

Shortly after the 9/11 terrorist attacks on the United States, Orth traveled to Central Asia to investigate the connection between drugs and terrorism for a piece titled "Afghanistan's Deadly Habit."

Orth has investigated pedophile priest Paul Shanley and the Laci Peterson murder. Orth has also written articles on Tom Cruise and Scientology, Madonna, Tina Turner, Karl Lagerfeld and Conrad Black.

She chronicled the Colombian hostage rescue of Ingrid Betancourt in a November 2008 piece titled "Inside Colombia's Hostage War"  and wrote about Elda Neyis, aka Karina, Colombia's most notorious FARC female revolutionary.

Orth was one of the first journalists to report on child molestation charges against celebrities Woody Allen and Michael Jackson.

Reporting on Michael Jackson 
In January 1994 Vanity Fair published "Nightmare in Neverland," the first of five articles from 1994 through 2005 that investigated the charges stemming from Jackson's alleged behavior towards underage boys instigated by the 1993 child sexual abuse accusations against Michael Jackson.

Using sources that included attorneys, relatives of the accusers, and former Jackson employees, Orth was first to report that Jackson allegedly seduced boys by giving them Coca-Cola cans filled with white wine he called “Jesus juice” and red wine he purportedly nicknamed “Jesus blood.” She also broke the news that Jackson’s ex-wife Debbie Rowe allegedly threatened to reveal Jackson’s secrets unless she received at least $8 million in hush money. Orth was the first reporter to quote Ray Chandler, the uncle of the then-unnamed boy at the center of the 1993 investigation against Jackson.

For more than a decade Orth continued to report on Jackson including his treatment in the media pegged to Jackson's appearance on ABC News’ Primetime Live. She observed and wrote about two of Jackson's trials including a civil lawsuit filed against him in 2003 by concert promoter Marcel Avram, and the 2005 criminal trial on child molestation, for which Jackson was acquitted.

Orth’s reporting was later associated with 2019 HBO documentary “Leaving Neverland." In conjunction with the release of the documentary, in March 2019 Orth wrote “10 Undeniable Facts About The Michael Jackson Sexual Abuse Allegations,” for Vanity Fair. In the article, Orth revisits many of the crucial details of the case reiterating the sources for her writing.

Reporting on Woody Allen and Mia Farrow 
Orth reported extensively for Vanity Fair on the child molestation charges against director Woody Allen.

Orth's 10,000-word November 1992 piece, " Mia's Story" broke the news that Woody Allen was in therapy for inappropriate behavior towards his then 7-year-old adopted daughter Dylan and the history of Allen's relationship with Farrow's adopted teenage daughter, Soon Yi-Previn. In 2013, Orth also broke the news that a video of Dylan confiding to Farrow about what she said happened with Allen had been obtained by New York’s Fox Channel 5 but was never aired.

“Mia’s Story” is among the most-read stories in Vanity Fair's archives.

In 2013,  in a piece titled "Momma Mia!" Orth obtained the first on the record interview with then 28-year-old Dylan Farrow. In the story, Dylan detailed her allegations of how Allen sexually abused her in the attic of the family home, which Allen strongly denied. Dylan also discussed the impact the child molestation case had on her life and the Farrow family Orth interviewed eight of Farrow’s children for the 9,400-word story which generated significant media interest in Farrow’s son, Ronan, as possibly the biological son of Frank Sinatra. All eight of Farrow’s children interviewed for the story said they suffered psychological damage from the case and wanted nothing to do with Allen.

In response to Orth’s 2013 story, and the renewed media attention on the decades-old accusations and custody fight between Allen and Farrow, Allen drafted a lengthy opinion piece published the New York Times in 2014 denying that he had abused Dylan when she was a child in the early 1990s.

On the same day Allen’s editorial was published in the New York Times, Orth published “10 Undeniable Facts About the Woody Allen Sexual Abuse Allegation” in Vanity Fair.

In a May 2016 column for The Hollywood Reporter, Ronan Farrow noted that most of the facts of the claims made by Dylan against Allen had been “meticulously reported by journalist Maureen Orth.”

Much of the reporting by Orth on the relationship between Woody Allen and Mia Farrow was used by filmmakers Kirby Dick, Amy Ziering and Amy Herdy as the basis for their 2021 HBO Documentary “Allen v. Farrow.” Orth was interviewed for the documentary and appears on camera in episodes one and three of the four-part series.

Reporting on Andrew Cunanan and Gianni Versace 
In the spring of 1997, Orth read a news story in the New York Daily News about the manhunt for Andrew Cunanan, and an unlikely string of murders. She began conducting research and gathering information on Cunanan and spent nine weeks developing a story set to appear in Vanity Fair.

While Vanity Fair was doing the final fact-checking of Orth's article, Versace was killed in Miami on July 15, 1997. That night, Cunanan was named as a suspect and the following morning Orth broke the news on NBC's Today Show that, according to her research, Versace and Cunanan had met each other backstage at the San Francisco Opera in 1990 when the designer created the costumes for the opera's production of "Capriccio."

Orth conducted additional research in Miami for her piece, “The Killer’s Trail,” which appeared in the September 1997 issue of the magazine. After Versace's murder, and before her article was published in Vanity Fair, book publisher Delacorte was rumored to have paid Orth a significant advance for a book-length reworking of the story.

Two years later, Orth published Vulgar Favors: Andrew Cunanan, Gianni Versace, and the Largest failed Manhunt in U.S. History. She dedicated the book to her late husband, Tim Russert, and their son Luke, as well as Orth's mother. In the book, Orth claimed, among other things, that Gianni Versace had AIDS and that his deteriorating health was kept a secret to avoid putting a public listing of his company at risk.

In October 2016, reports began circulating that FX would be developing a television miniseries based on Orth's book as part of the American Crime Story franchise. In January 2018, FX debuted a nine-episode miniseries, "American Crime Story: The Assassination of Gianni Versace" starring Darren Criss, Édgar Ramírez, Penélope Cruz and Ricky Martin. Orth was a creative consultant on the series.

The Versace family was unhappy with how Gianni Versace was portrayed in both the book and the television show, stating that it presented a distorted and fictionalized account of the designer's life.  At the time of the television show's premier, the publisher of the book vigorously defended Orth's reporting saying:"First published almost 19 years ago, Vulgar Favors is a carefully reported and extensively-sourced work of investigative journalism by an award-winning journalist with impeccable credentials. The book has stood the test of time and is widely regarded as the definitive account of Andrew Cunanan's chilling crime spree.  Random House stands by the book and its author, Maureen Orth."At the 2018 Emmy Awards, the series, based on Orth's reporting, won seven Emmy Awards including Outstanding Limited Series, Outstanding Casting, and Outstanding Contemporary Costumes. Orth appeared onstage with the cast and producers to accept the award. The Hollywood Foreign Press Association honored the program with four Golden Globe nominations and two wins for Best Limited Series and Darren Criss won for Best Actor in a limited series.

Family and personal life
Orth lives in Washington, D.C. In 1983, she married the political journalist Tim Russert, whom she met at the 1980 Democratic National Convention. Russert was the Washington bureau chief of NBC News and moderator of Meet the Press when he died on June 13, 2008. Their son, Luke Russert, who was born in August 1985, is a former NBC News correspondent.

Orth is the dedicatee of her friend Larry McMurtry's Pulitzer Prize-winning novel Lonesome Dove.

She has served on the Executive Board of the College of Letters and Sciences, University of California, Berkeley and been a Trustee of the University of California, Berkeley, Foundation since 2010 .  Orth has also served on the Boards of Internews and the National Council of Returned Peace Corps Volunteers.

Orth and her family have vacationed on Nantucket Island since 1993 where their neighbors included television personality Fred Rodgers.

Orth is a supporter of the Peace Corps. For the 50th anniversary of the Peace Corps, she produced a series of video postcards celebrating the organization.

Philanthropy 

Orth developed an interest in Colombia while a Peace Corps Volunteer in Medellin following college. While there, she built a school the community named for her: Escuela Marina Orth. In 2005, at the request of the Secretary of Education of Medellin, she founded two non-profit foundations: The Marina Orth Foundation, a 501c3 public charity in the United States, and Fundacion Marina Orth in Colombia. The Marina Orth Foundation serves 21 schools, and each K-5 primary school student their own laptop through the One Laptop Per Child program. The program emphasizes STEM, robotics, English and leadership. More than 13,000 students have been involved with the program. Computer coding is taught at the third-grade level and all students are taught robotics beginning in kindergarten. International volunteers help to teach English and organize extra-curricular activities. The foundation has sent the school's robotics teams to international competitions.

Books
Vulgar Favors: Andrew Cunanan, Gianni Versace and the Largest Failed Manhunt in U.S. History (1999)
The Importance of Being Famous: Behind the Scenes of the Celebrity-Industrial Complex (2004)

Awards and honors

 National Magazine Award for group coverage of the arts while at Newsweek (1973)
 National Magazine Award nomination for her story in Vanity Fair on Arianna Huffington and Michael Huffington titled "Arianna's Virtual Candidate" (1994)
 National Alumnae Achievement Award from the Kappa Kappa Gamma sorority (2006) 
 Emily Couric Women's Leadership Award, Charlottesville, Virginia (2012)
 Order of San Carlos, Colombia's highest civilian honor for outstanding service from Colombian President Juan Manuel Santos (2015)
 McCall-Pierpaoli Humanitarian of the Year Award from Refugees International (2015) 
 Distinguished Alumnus from the Cal Alumni Club of Washington D.C (2016)
 Doctorate in Humane Letters from the University of San Francisco (2017) 
 Campanile Excellence in Achievement Award from the University of California at Berkeley (2021)

References

External links

Living people
American women journalists
Peace Corps volunteers
University of California, Berkeley alumni
Journalists from Washington, D.C.
Vanity Fair (magazine) people
Kappa Kappa Gamma
Newsweek people
1943 births